David Marc "Dave" Kreps (born 1950 in New York City) is a game theorist and economist and professor at the Graduate School of Business at Stanford University (since 1980). The Stanford University Department of Economics appointed Kreps the Adams Distinguished Professor of Management. He is known for his analysis of dynamic choice models and non-cooperative game theory, particularly the idea of sequential equilibrium, which he developed with Stanford Business School colleague Robert B. Wilson.

He earned his A.B. from Dartmouth College in 1972 and his Ph.D. from Stanford in 1975.  Kreps won the John Bates Clark Medal in 1989.  He was awarded an honorary Ph.D. by the Université Paris-Dauphine in 2001. With colleagues Paul Milgrom and Robert B. Wilson, he was awarded the 2018 John J. Carty Award for the Advancement of Science. He is a member of the National Academy of Sciences. In 2018, Kreps was awarded the Erwin Plein Nemmers Prize in Economics by Northwestern University.

He has also written many books, including Microeconomics for Managers, A Course in Microeconomic Theory, and Game Theory and Economic Modeling.

See also
 Trade-off Talking Rational Economic Person

External links
David M. Kreps' home page at Stanford University

References

1950 births
Living people
Dartmouth College alumni
Stanford University alumni
Stanford University Graduate School of Business faculty
Stanford University Department of Economics faculty
20th-century American economists
21st-century American economists
Information economists
Game theorists
Mathematical economists
General equilibrium theorists
Fellows of the Econometric Society
Fellows of the American Academy of Arts and Sciences
Members of the United States National Academy of Sciences
Distinguished Fellows of the American Economic Association
Nancy L. Schwartz Memorial Lecture speakers